The hooded grosbeak (Hesperiphona abeillei) is a passerine bird in the finch family found in the highlands of Central America, principally in Mexico and Guatemala.

This is a medium large grosbeak with a large bill. The male has a black head and bright yellow upper parts. The female is less brightly coloured and has a smaller black cap.

The species was briefly described by the French naturalist René Lesson in 1839 under the binomial name Guiraca abaillei.  The International Ornithologists' Union now assigns the hooded grosbeak together with the closely related evening grosbeak to the genus Hesperiphona. This genus was introduced by the French ornithologist Charles Lucien Bonaparte in 1850.
Some authorities place these two grosbeak species together with the hawfinch in the genus Coccothraustes.

References

External links
Videos and photos from the Internet Bird Collection

hooded grosbeak
Birds of Mexico
Birds of Guatemala
hooded grosbeak
Taxa named by René Lesson